Adela Úcar Innerarity (Bilbao, 1980) is a Spanish journalist, host and producer.

She studied Audiovisual Communication at the University of Navarre with a postgraduate course in Documentary Direction at the University of Melbourne (Australia), and she started working for Discovery Networks Asia in Singapore in 2004, after winning the international competition Discovery Channel "Reel Race" in 2003.

Television 
 Lonely Planet (Discovery Channel <UK version only>, 2007)
 Españoles en el mundo (TVE 1)
 Mucho Viaje (La 2)
 21 días (Cuatro, 2009–2011)
 Globe Trekker (PBS, 2012) <also known as Pilot Guides)

References

External links 
 Perfil de Adela Úcar en cuatro.com
 
 Adela Úcar en FormulaTV.com

Spanish television presenters
Spanish women television presenters
People from Bilbao
1980 births
Living people